Orania castanea is a species of sea snail, a marine gastropod mollusk, in the family Muricidae, the murex snails or rock snails.

Distribution
This marine species occurs off South Africa, from False Bay to the south coast of Natal, and Walters Shoals, south of Madagascar.

References

  Turton W.H. (1932). Marine Shells of Port Alfred, S. Africa. Humphrey Milford, London, xvi + 331 pp., 70 pls.
 Houart, R.: Zuccon, D. & Puillandre, N. (2019). Description of new genera and new species of Ergalataxinae (Gastropoda: Muricidae). Novapex. 20 (Hors série 12): 1-52.

External links
 Küster, H. C. (1843-1860). Die Gattungen Buccinum, Purpura, Concholepas und Monoceros. In: Küster, H. C., Ed. Systematisches Conchylien-Cabinet von Martini und Chemnitz. Neu herausgegeben und vervollständigt. Dritten Bandes erste Abtheilung. 3(1): 1-229, pls 1-35. Nürnberg: Bauer & Raspe
 Sowerby, G. B., III. (1886). Marine shells of South Africa collected at Port Elizabeth, with descriptions of some new species. Journal of Conchology. 5(1): 1-13
 Claremont, M.; Houart, R.; Williams, S. T. & Reid, D. G. (2013). A molecular phylogenetic framework for the Ergalataxinae (Neogastropoda: Muricidae). Journal of Molluscan Studies. 79 (1): 19-29.
 Sowerby, G. B., III. (1897). Appendix to marine shells of South Africa : a catalogue of all the known species with references to figures in various works, descriptions of new species, and figures of such as are new, little known, or hitherto unfigured. London: G.B

Gastropods described in 1886
Orania (gastropod)